An heir (fem. heiress) is one who inherits.

Heir may also refer to:
Heir apparent, the first in line to a throne or other title, who cannot be displaced by birth of another heir
Heir presumptive, the current first in line to a title
Heirs of the line, heirs in the line of succession
Heirs of the body, descendants of a particular person who are entitled to inherit a title or property

Geography
Heir Island, southwest of County Cork, Ireland

Books
The Heir, 1922 novel by Vita Sackville-West
 The Heir (novel), 2015 novel by Kiera Cass
The Heir Chronicles, by Cinda Williams Chima

Film and TV
The Heirs, a 2013 Korean TV series

Other uses
Heir (fragrance), line of perfumes
Eva Heir (born 1943), Norwegian politician
Robert Heir (1832–1868), actor in Australia, married Fanny Cathcart
Heir (singer), Italian-Russian singer-songwriter and model

See also
Heiress (disambiguation)
Inheritor (disambiguation)
Pretender, type of less than fully recognized heir